Üllő is a town in Pest county, Hungary.

External links 
 Street map 

Populated places in Pest County